The canton of Plouha is an administrative division of the Côtes-d'Armor department, northwestern France. Its borders were modified at the French canton reorganisation which came into effect in March 2015. Its seat is in Plouha.

Composition 

It consists of the following communes:

Binic-Étables-sur-Mer
Le Faouët
Gommenec'h
Lannebert
Lantic
Lanvollon
Pléguien
Plouha
Plourhan
Pludual
Saint-Gilles-les-Bois
Saint-Quay-Portrieux
Tréguidel
Tréméven
Tressignaux
Tréveneuc
Trévérec

Councillors

Pictures of the canton

References 

Cantons of Côtes-d'Armor